IMAX Magic Carpet is a large format film system, using two IMAX 15/70 mm film format projectors. One of the projectors projects onto a screen in front of the audience, the second projector projects onto a screen under the audience, which is visible through a transparent floor. The system was demonstrated in Osaka in 1990, and two films were produced for the format; Flying Raft and Flowers in the Sky.

See also
 List of film formats

External links
 http://www.ewh.ieee.org/reg/7/millennium/imax/imax_chronology.html
 IMAX Magic Carpet in action

References 

IMAX
Motion picture film formats